Charles Camilleri (7 September 1931 – 3 January 2009) was a Maltese composer.

Early life
Camilleri was born in Ħamrun and, as a teenager, composed many works based on folk music and legends of his native Malta.

Career
Camilleri moved from his early influences by Maltese folk music to a musical form "in which nothing is fixed and his compositions evolve from themselves with a sense of fluency and inevitability". He composed over 100 works for orchestra, chamber ensemble, voice and solo instruments. Camilleri's work has been performed throughout the world and his research of folk music and improvisation, the influences of the sounds of Africa and Asia, together with the academic study of European music, helped him create a "universal" style.

Camilleri is recognized in Malta as one of the major composers of his generation. His works include Malta Suite, Maltese Dances, A Maltese Overture - Din l-Art Helwa, operas in Maltese, a ballet based on the Knights of Malta and the oratorio Pawlu ta' Malta.  His piano piece Cantilena, is currently part of the Grade 5 Trinity Guildhall piano syllabus. The Missa Mundi for solo organ was described by its first publisher as "the organ's Rite of Spring". Noospheres (1977) was premiered at Canada House in London on 12 May 1979 by Kyla Greenbaum (Crowcroft) and subsequently recorded by her.

Death and legacy
He died on 3 January 2009 at the age of 77. His funeral took place two days later at Naxxar, his long-time town of residence. Flags across Malta were flown at half-mast in tribute to him.

In 2014, the Central Bank of Malta issued a silver €10 and gold €50 coin in Camilleri's honour - and as part of the EUROPA star collector coin series which  highlights European culture and events on an annual basis.

Works
Piano Concerto No. 1 "Mediterranean" (1948, revised 1978)
Piano Concerto No. 2 "Maqam" (1967/8)
Four African Sketches (1980?, for guitar, dedicated to J.H. [Kwabena] Nketia), Folk Prelude; Shadow of the Moons; Circle Dance, African Rhondo 
Piano Concerto No. 3 "Leningrad" (1986)
Malta Suite (1946)
Cello Concerto (1992)
Flute Concerto (1993)
Clarinet Concerto (1981)
Organ Concerto (1983)
Piano Trio (1972)
Missa Mundi, for organ (in five movements: 1. The Offering; 2. Fire over the Earth; 3. Fire in the Earth; 4. Communion; 5. Prayer) (1972)
Morphogenesis, for organ (in five movements: 1. Le Cœur de la Matière; 2. L'énergie humaine; 3. L'atomisme de l'esprit; 4. Activation de l'énergie humaine; 5. Le monde de la Matière) (1978)
Wine of Peace, for organ (1976)
Cosmic Visions, for strings (1976)
Noospheres, for piano (1977)
L'amour de Dieu, for organ (1978)
Maltese Cross, opera (performed in Paris in 2003 conducted by Christophe Vella)
Shomyo, for oboe (2001)
Shomyo, for clarinet (2001)
Shomyo, for flute (2001)
Sonata Breve, for oboe and piano (2002)
Paganiana, for piano 4-hands (Note: This is a set of variations on the 24th Caprice of Paganini, but its title is Paganiana rather than the expected Paganiniana)

Notes

References

External links
https://web.archive.org/web/20070927094652/http://www.maltatoday.com.mt/2001/0624/people.html
https://web.archive.org/web/20070724201332/http://www.collegium-musicum.net/cc.asp
 Charles Camilleri: Prolific Maltese composer with a worldwide reputation

1931 births
2009 deaths
20th-century classical composers
20th-century conductors (music)
20th-century male musicians
21st-century classical composers
21st-century male musicians
Composers for pipe organ
Eurovision Song Contest conductors
Male classical composers
Maltese composers
Maltese classical composers
Maltese opera composers